N-acetylglucosaminyldiphosphoundecaprenol N-acetyl-beta-D-mannosaminyltransferase (uridine diphosphoacetyl-mannosamineacetylglucosaminylpyrophosphorylundecaprenol acetylmannosaminyltransferase, N-acetylmannosaminyltransferase, UDP-N-acetylmannosamine:N-acetylglucosaminyl diphosphorylundecaprenol N-acetylmannosaminyltransferase, UDP-N-acetyl-D-mannosamine:N-acetyl-beta-D-glucosaminyldiphosphoundecaprenol beta-1,4-N-acetylmannosaminyltransferase) is an enzyme with systematic name UDP-N-acetyl-D-mannosamine:N-acetyl-beta-D-glucosaminyldiphosphoundecaprenol 4-beta-N-acetylmannosaminyltransferase. This enzyme catalyses the following chemical reaction

 UDP-N-acetyl-D-mannosamine + N-acetyl-D-glucosaminyldiphosphoundecaprenol  UDP + N-acetyl-beta-D-mannosaminyl-(1->4)-N-acetyl-D-glucosaminyldiphosphoundecaprenol

This enzyme is involved in the biosynthesis of teichoic acid linkage units in bacterial cell walls.

References

External links 
 

EC 2.4.1